The Vimeu is a natural region of France, located west of Picardy and bounded by two valleys, that of Bresle in the south and that of the Somme in the north.

References

Picardy
Natural regions of France
Hauts-de-France region articles needing translation from French Wikipedia